Heathrow Terminals 2 & 3 is a London Underground station at Heathrow Airport on the Heathrow branch of the Piccadilly line, which serves Heathrow Terminal 2 and Terminal 3. It was named Heathrow Terminals 1, 2, 3 until January 2016, when Heathrow Terminal 1 was closed. Despite the renaming of the station, the signage on the platform still says Heathrow Terminals 1, 2, 3 as of June 2022. The station is situated in Travelcard Zone 6, along with the nearby Heathrow Terminals 2 & 3 railway station served by Heathrow Express and Elizabeth line services.

History
The station opened as Heathrow Central on 16 December 1977 as the final phase of the Piccadilly line's extension from Hounslow West to the airport. The preceding station, Hatton Cross, had opened as the interim terminus in 1975. At its opening, the station served as the terminus of what became known as the Heathrow branch of the line – previously it had been the Hounslow branch. It was the first time that an airport had been directly served by an underground railway system.

With the development of the airport's new Terminal 4 underway for which a separate Underground station would be provided, the station was initially renamed Heathrow Central Terminals 1, 2, 3 from 3 September 1983, then renamed Heathrow Terminals 1, 2, 3 on 6 October 1986.

The Terminal 4 station is located on a unidirectional single track loop from Hatton Cross to Heathrow Terminals 2 & 3. On the opening of the Terminal 4 station, most direct services from Hatton Cross to Terminals 2 & 3 ceased, with most Piccadilly line trains going first to Terminal 4. This meant that the westbound tunnel direct from Hatton Cross to Terminals 1, 2, 3 was hardly used for over 20 years. However, some early morning trains still went directly to Heathrow Terminals 1, 2, 3.

For the construction of the tunnel to the new Heathrow Terminal 5 station, the loop track and Terminal 4 station closed temporarily on 7 January 2005 and Heathrow Terminals 1, 2, 3 once again became the terminus of the line. This situation continued until 17 September 2006, when the Terminal 5 tunnel works were sufficiently complete for the loop tunnel and Terminal 4 station to reopen.

Heathrow Terminal 5 station opened on 27 March 2008, but the frequency of trains on the Heathrow branch of the Piccadilly line remained the same as previously, with services from Hatton Cross to Heathrow split. Alternate trains run either to Terminal 4 (around the loop and back to Central London via Terminals 2 & 3), or direct to Terminals 2 & 3 and Terminal 5.

Heathrow Terminals 2 & 3 has a double crossover immediately to the east which can be seen from the platform. This is used to allow trains to enter either platforms 1 or 2 heading westbound to terminate here. It is used for the last Heathrow service of the day Monday to Saturday and during times of service disruption. Also, a short distance to the west, are two further crossovers where the single track loop line from Terminal 4 rejoins the eastbound track from Terminal 5 to Terminals 2 & 3.

The station has six escalators of which two operate from the platform to the ticket hall area and two operate in the opposite direction; the other two connect the ticket hall area to the surface. A mezzanine floor between the platform and ticket hall levels provide staff accommodation and facilities. British Transport Police maintain a presence at Heathrow.

Until 2012, free transfer was not possible between terminals, in contrast to the Heathrow Express. In January 2012, free travel was introduced for Oyster card and contactless payment card holders between the Heathrow stations on the Piccadilly line. Journeys from Heathrow Terminals 2 & 3 or Heathrow Terminal 5 to Terminal 4 via the Piccadilly line require a change at Hatton Cross (this journey is free, despite Hatton Cross not being part of the free travel zone).

As of March 2012, the station had undergone renovation works which featured an extended control room, all six escalators refurbished, a station enhancement and two Step Free Access lifts from the ticket hall (located near the bottom of the escalators from street level) to the platforms.  Step-free access to street level will continue to be served by the two airport lifts from the Coach station.

Services

Connections
The station is directly below Heathrow Central bus station, which offers both local buses and long-distance express coaches.

London Buses routes 105, 111, 278, 285, A10, U3, X26, X140, night routes N9, N140 and non-TfL routes 4, 7 (limited service), 8 (one journey only), 555 and 724 serve the station.

See also
Heathrow Terminals 2 & 3 railway station

References

External links

 
 
 
 
 – transport map for Heathrow showing Underground, Heathrow Express and Heathrow Connect rail, and the N9 night bus

Piccadilly line stations
London Underground Night Tube stations
Tube stations in the London Borough of Hillingdon
Airport railway stations in the United Kingdom
1
Railway stations in Great Britain opened in 1977
1977 establishments in England